Manuel Bartlett Díaz (born 23 February 1936) is a Mexican politician, and the current director of the public energy company CFE, and former Secretary of the Interior. Bartlett was elected to the Senate of the Republic for the 2000–2006 term, where he became known as one of the most staunch defenders of state ownership of electric utilities. On May 27, 2006, in view of the low possibility of Institutional Revolutionary Party (PRI) candidate Roberto Madrazo winning the Presidency, Bartlett declared that he would vote for Andrés Manuel López Obrador, then candidate for the Party of the Democratic Revolution, to avoid a right-wing victory. Madrazo and the national leader of the PRI, Mariano Palacios, both condemned these declarations, and announced the possible expulsion of Bartlett from the party. Bartlett responded by continuing to speak out against both leaders.

Since the 2006 election, Bartlett has aligned himself with López Obrador and his Coalition for the Good of All. In 2012 he reentered national politics, being elected a senator for the left-wing Labor Party, in coalition with López Obrador's PRD. After López Obrador's election as Mexican president in 2018, he appointed Bartlett to become the CEO of Comisión Federal de Electricidad (CFE), the state-owned electric utility of Mexico, the country's second most powerful state-owned company after PEMEX. Bartlett has been described as a corrupt politician.

Controversy 
In a 3-part article series, investigative journalist Charles Bowden offers eyewitness accounts of Bartlett's involvement (along with other senior Mexican political, law enforcement, security and military officials) in the decision to order the kidnap, torture and murder of American DEA officer Enrique S. "Kiki" Camarena in 1985 in order to shut down his successful campaign against the Guadalajara Cartel. In these accounts, cartel figures repeatedly mention they expect Bartlett Díaz to one day become President of Mexico, with the implication that they will prosper as a result. Earlier accounts claimed that DEA suspicions about Bartlett Díaz's involvement in the murder led to the ruling PRI party's refusal to consider him as a presidential candidate, leading to the selection of Carlos Salinas de Gortari in Bartlett's place.

See also
 1988 Mexican general election

References

External links
La CFE de Bartlett se convierte en una máquina de control político en México 

1936 births
Governors of Puebla
Living people
Institutional Revolutionary Party politicians
Mexican Secretaries of the Interior
Members of the Senate of the Republic (Mexico)
Politicians from Puebla
Mexican people of Cornish descent
20th-century Mexican politicians
21st-century Mexican politicians
People from Puebla (city)
National Autonomous University of Mexico alumni
Academic staff of the National Autonomous University of Mexico